The 1943 Purdue Boilermaker football team represented Purdue University in the 1943 Big Ten Conference football season. In their second year under head coach Elmer Burnham, the Boilermakers compiled an undefeated 9–0 record (6–0 Big Ten), outscored their opponents by a total of 214 to 55, and finished the season ranked No. 5 in the final AP Poll.

The 1943 squad was the only undefeated team playing a full schedule in major college football, but finished third in the country per the AP Poll. This would seemingly be sufficient grounds for Purdue to claim a 1943 National Championship as the NCAA itself did not recognize champions in the era. However, Purdue has never pursued this claim.

The 1942 Purdue team had won only one game, but the 1943 team was bolstered with several new players who had been transferred to Purdue as part of the V-12 Navy College Training Program.

Purdue guard Alex Agase was selected as a consensus first-team player on the 1943 All-America Team, and was later inducted into the College Football Hall of Fame. Fullback Tony Butkovich was also selected as a first-team All-American by The Sporting News, the United Press, the Central Press, and Stars and Stripes newspaper. Butkovich led the Big Ten in scoring with 14 touchdowns despite missing the last two games after being called to active duty by the Marines; he was killed in action at the Battle of Okinawa in April 1945.

Schedule

Players
 Alex Agase, guard #95
 Dick Barwegen, guard #21
 Frank Bauman, end #74
 Joe Buscemi #50
 Dick Bushnell #29
 Jack Butt #40
 Tony Butkovich, #25, fullback
 Jim Darr #70
 Boris Dimancheff #87
 Stan Dubicki, #22
 Bump Elliott#18
 John Genis, tackle #69
 Herbert Hoffman, end #99
 Tom Hughes #44
 Mike Kasap, tackle #64
 Bill Newell #96
 Bill O'Keefe #34
 Keith Parker #88
 Bill Stuart #89
 Sam Vacanti #33
 John Staak, tackle #32
 Lewis Rose, Halfback #36

Coaches and administrators
 Head coach: Elmer Burnham
 Assistant coaches: Cecil Isbell, Sam Voinoff, Joe Dienhart
 Athletic director: Guy "Red" Mackey

Season summary

Illinois
Tony Butkovich 12 rushes, 207 yards

Ohio State
Tony Butkovich 36 rushes, 123 yards 
Babe Dimancheff 16 rushes, 122 yards

Iowa
Tony Butkovich 19 rushes, 149 yards

Wisconsin
Tony Butkovich 28 rushes, 147 yards 
Babe Dimancheff 15 rushes, 111 yards

References

Purdue
Purdue Boilermakers football seasons
Big Ten Conference football champion seasons
College football undefeated seasons
Purdue Boilermakers football